The Cloud Rider is a 1925 American silent action adventure aviation film directed by Bruce M. Mitchell and starring Al Wilson and Virginia Lee Corbin. It was distributed by Film Booking Offices of America.<ref>[http://www.silentera.com/PSFL/data/C/CloudRider1925.html "Data:'The Cloud Rider."] Silentera.com, 2019. Retrieved: June 20, 2019.</ref>The Cloud Rider was one of a series of films that showcased the exploits of the stunt pilots in Hollywood.

Plot
As described in a review in a film magazine, champion aviator Bruce Torrence (Wilson) and member of the secret service has a formidable rival for the hand of Zella Wingate (Ferguson) in the person of Juan Lascelles (von Meter), who owns a fleet of airplanes used to smuggle drugs. Thinking to get rid of Bruce, Juan loosens a wheel on the airplane. Zella goes up in the machine and is saved from death by Bruce who makes a thrilling transfer to the airplane in midair. Later, Bruce finds Zella in Juan's arms. Zella's little sister Blythe (Corbin), forbidden to attend a party, goes to the beach and finds Juan talking to his henchmen. Reporting to Bruce, he starts out after Juan's machine. Blythe hides in the fuselage and accidentally wrecks the airplane by monkeying with the control wires. Bruce and Blythe find themselves in the woods and Bruce realizes that it is Blythe that he loves. They are captured by Juan who takes Blythe away in his airplane. Bruce escapes with the aid of a former buddy among Juan's henchman. Bruce gives chase. Blythe operates the controls and causes the airplane to drop into the water. Bruce jumps from his machine and saves Blythe and captures Juan. Bruce and Blythe start out on their aerial honeymoon.

Cast

 Al Wilson as Bruce Torrence
 Virginia Lee Corbin as Blythe Wingate
 Harry von Meter as Juan Lascelles
 Helen Ferguson as Zella Wingate
 Frank Rice as Hank Higgins
 Melbourne MacDowell as David Torrence
 Brinsley Shaw as Peter Wingate
 Frank Tomick as Pilot
 Boyd Monteith as Pilot
 Frank Clarke as Pilot

Production
Al Wilson was not only the star of The Cloud Rider but also gathered together friends who would form a "flying circus". Wilson worked together with stuntmen like Frank Clarke and Wally Timm primarily for film companies, flying as a "stunt pilot" in the films. After Wilson became a flying instructor and a short period as manager of the Mercury Aviation Company, founded by one of his students, Cecil B. DeMille.

Wilson became more and more skilled in performing stunts, including wing-walking, and left the company to become a professional stunt pilot, specializing in Hollywood aviation films. After numerous appearances in stunt roles, he started his career as an actor in 1923 with the serial The Eagle's Talons.Wynne 1987, p. 38.The Cloud Rider was one of the first films in a five-year period where Wilson alternately wrote, acted and flew in a career that "spanned more than 10 years, and he acted in more films than any other professional pilot."

Wilson produced his own movies until 1927, when he went back to work with Universal Pictures, where he had made strong business connections. 

Reception
Wilson made an appearance in person on stage when The Cloud Rider was premiered at the California Theatre in down-town Los Angeles.

Aviation film historian Stephen Pendo, in Aviation in the Cinema (1985) said The Cloud Rider was only one of a long list of aviation films that showcased Wilson's talents. The film featured a dangerous aerial stunt where a transfer from aircraft to aircraft involved a "missing wheel" that had to be re-attached. "Further aerial action included a plane crash in the ocean."

Preservation
A copy of The Cloud Rider is preserved in the Cineteca Italiana, Milan.

References
Notes

Citations

Bibliography

 Pendo, Stephen. Aviation in the Cinema. Lanham, Maryland: Scarecrow Press, 1985. .
 Wynne, H. Hugh. The Motion Picture Stunt Pilots and Hollywood's Classic Aviation Movies''. Missoula, Montana: Pictorial Histories Publishing Co., 1987. .

External links

 
 
 Lobby poster, color

1925 films
American silent feature films
American aviation films
Film Booking Offices of America films
American black-and-white films
1920s action adventure films
American action adventure films
Films directed by Bruce M. Mitchell
1920s American films
Silent action adventure films